World Safari is a documentary film released in 1977 made from footage of Alby Mangels and John Field's six-year journey around 56 countries and four continents in the 1970s. Includes a motorcycle trip across Australia, living with Buddhist monks, selling life insurance on the side of the road, and getting lost in a two-cylinder DAF van while crossing the Sahara desert.

Originally titled Happy Go Lucky Highway,  World Safari has two sequels, World Safari II: The Final Adventure, released 20 December 1984 (Best Family Film of the Year, 1986 Los Angeles Film Festival) and Escape: World Safari III released 26 December 1988.

See also
Cinema of Australia

References

External links

Alby Mangels official site

1977 films
1977 documentary films
Australian documentary films
Long-distance motorcycle riding
Australian adventure films